Richard Courtney is an academic.

Richard Courtney may also refer to:

Richard Edmond Courtney
C. Richard Courtney, character in We're in the Money (film)

See also
Richard Courtenay (disambiguation)